Dennis is a town in Barnstable County, Massachusetts, United States, located near the center of Cape Cod. The population was 14,674 at the 2020 census.

The town encompasses five distinct villages, each of which has its own post office. These constituent villages are Dennis (including North Dennis), Dennis Port, East Dennis, South Dennis, and West Dennis.

History

Dennis was first settled by Europeans in 1639, by John Crowe (later Crowell), Antony Thacher, and Thomas Howes, as part of the town of Yarmouth. It was known then as the East Precinct. The original inhabitants who preceded English settlers called the northern sections of town Nobscuesset, Sesuit, and Quivet.

The town officially separated and incorporated in 1793. It was named after resident minister, Rev. Josiah Dennis. There was not enough land for farming, so seafaring became the town's major industry in its early history, centered around the Shiverick Shipyard.

Currently, Dennis is a popular seaside resort town, notable for its stately colonial mansions along the northern Cape Cod Bay coastline, and its picturesque, warm-water beaches along the southern Nantucket Sound.

The Cape Playhouse, in northern Dennis, is one of the oldest summer theatres in the United States and among the best known. Actress Bette Davis was "discovered" while working there as an usher. Other notable past and present Dennis residents include author Mary Higgins Clark (1927–2020) and actress Amy Jo Johnson, who grew up in Dennis.

Geography

The town of Dennis spans the width of Cape Cod, with Cape Cod Bay to the north, Brewster to the northeast, Harwich to the southeast, Nantucket Sound to the south, and Yarmouth to the west. The Town of Dennis comprises the villages of Dennis Port, Dennis Village (including North Dennis), East Dennis, South Dennis and West Dennis.

The town lies on the eastern banks of the Bass River, which nearly divides the cape in half. There are several small ponds and lakes in town, as well as Sesuit Harbor to the north and West Dennis Harbor to the south.

The level south side of the town was formed primarily from glacial outwash. Bass River and Swan Pond River were carved in the outwash plain by large flows of water off of Laurentide Ice Sheet of the Wisconsin glaciation.

The north and south shores of the town have many beaches, as well as the Dennis Yacht Club in the north and West Dennis Yacht Club in the south.

While West Dennis is indeed west of Dennisport, it is south of South Dennis. East Dennis is north of South Dennis, and Dennis is on the western shore, to the west of East Dennis.

Dennis
Chapin Memorial Beach, which was previously known as Black Flats for its black sands and extensive tidal flats, was named in honor of George H. Chapin, a real estate developer who donated the land to the Town after World War II. Chase Garden Creek empties into Cape Cod Bay at Chapin Beach, and serves as a boundary between Dennis and Yarmouth. It was named for the Chase family, settlers who were on the Cape by 1638.

The area leading to Chapin Beach has alternatively been known as Little Italy and Little Taunton for the Italian immigrants who came by way of Taunton, Massachusetts in the late 1800s to build the railroad on Cape Cod. Many streets in the area, such as Squadrilli Way, Dr. Boterro Road, Spadoni Road, and Angelo Road, as well as Lombardi Heights, were named for Italians. The area known as New Boston, including a road and a river, was named for a group of Bostonians who settled in the area.

Corporation Beach, which is also sometimes called Nobscussett Beach, was named for the Nobscussett Point Pier Corporation. It is located on the east side of Nobscusset Point. There was once an Indian village at Nobscussett Point and Harbor, which is also called the Bite, a misspelling of bight. Nobscussett is possibly related to the Algonquian word wanashqu, which means at the end of the rock.

Mayflower Beach was acquired by the Town in 1977 by eminent domain. It is named for the failed Mayflower Beach Condominiums Complex. At the other end of Mayflower Beach is Bayview Beach, which has a parking lot for residents only. Hippogriffe Road was named for a 678-ton clipper ship built in 1852 at the Shiverick Yards.

Dennis Port
Dennis Port was named by Thomas Howes, the village's first postmaster, in 1850. Previously it had been known as Crooks Neck, after Samuel Crook, an Indian who sold the land to English settlers in the 17th century. The name changed to Crookers Neck before becoming Dennis Port.

Glendon Road, and the beach named for the street, took their name from Hubert Glendon, a Marine officer who served as the Columbia University rowing coach after World War II, and who donated the beach to the village. To the west is Peter Hagis Beach, which is located on land donated by his widow. Also in the village is Inman Road Beach, named for the Inman family (including Isaiah Inman) who lived on the corner of Lower County Road. Raycroft Beach was named for Louis B. Raycroft, who often summered near Old Wharf Road and Sea Street.

The Plashes, a term which means "a small collection of standing water," is a conservation area with several small ponds and creeks connecting them. On the Harwich line is White Pond, so named because the way the light hits the water. It was formerly known as Aunt Lizzie Robbins Pond, named for a member of the Robbins family of Harwich, who arrived on the Cape in the early 1700s. Swan Pond took its name from the Algonquin word sowan, meaning south. It is also known as Jamies Pond, after James Chase.

Depot Street was named for the train station that once existed in the village. Searsville Road was named in honor of the Sears family, which was once prominent in East Dennis.

East Dennis
Cold Storage Road, and the beach of the same moniker, was named for the storehouses in the area that kept fish cold in the early 1900s. Off of Cold Storage Road is Salt Works Road, named for the salt works built in the 1700s by Captain John Sears. Dennis was once the Cape's leader in making salt, but closed in 1888 after salt mines in New York were opened. East Dennis was once known as Searsville, for the Sears family.

On the border with Brewster is Quivet Creek, which was once called Bound Brook. The Indians of the area called it Shuckquan, possibly from a word which means "spring fish." The creek runs next to Crowe's Pasture. It was once known as Indian Land as Crowe was a common name for families with white and Indian spouses. It is, along with Chapin Beach, one of two beaches in the town on which vehicles are allowed.

Sesuit Creek runs into Sesuit Harbor, with Sesuit Neck to the west, before emptying out into Cape Cod Bay. In the 1800s Asa Shiverick and his three sons built schooners, brigs, and clipper ships in the harbor. Two of the Clippers were more than 1,000 tons. A plaque honoring the shipyard, which closed in the 1860s, was placed in 1924. Shiverick Road near the harbor honors the family. Wild Hunter Road is named for the Shiverick-built clipper, Wild Hunter, which sailed as far as California and China.

South Dennis
The area of Scargo Lake and Scargo Hill in Dennis are associated with ancient Native American folklore. When viewed from Scargo Tower atop the hill, Scargo Lake appears to be in the shape of a fish. The lake is a glacial kettle pond and the hills on the northern side of the town are moraines, formed from gravel and debris left by the glacier, much like a conveyor belt.

There are several legends about the creation of the lake. One says that an Indian named Maushop dug out the pond, and then lit his pipe. The smoke from the pipe attracted dark clouds from which rain fell and filled the pond. More commonly heard is the story of a princess who was given three fish in a pumpkin by a young brave going off to war. He was gone so long that the fish began to outgrow the pumpkin. She then had the women of the village dig out the pond so the fish could survive.

The dirt the women dug out became Scargo Hill. Today it is the highest hill in the mid-Cape area. A stone tower commemorating Thomas Tobey, who settled in Dennis in 1678, was built in 1902. The Tobey family gave the tower to the Town in 1929.

Airline Road got its name because much of it runs in a straight line between Routes 134 and 6A. Nearby side streets also have aeronautical names, including Propeller Lane, Pilot Drive, Wing Lane, and Jet Drive. A series of streets off Kelly's Bay, just north of the Mid-Cape Highway, received their name for the supposed visit of Vikings to Cape Cod. Noreseman, Lief Ericson, Thorwald, Freydis, Viking, and Vinland Drives are all named for the seafaring Scandinavians. Kelly's Bay took its name from David O'Kelia who came to Cape Cod from his native Northern Ireland in the late 1600s. It is part of the Bass River. Prince Street is named for Thomas Prence who, as the governor of Plymouth Colony, certainly lived on Cape Cod.

Upstream from Kelly's Bay is Follins Pond. Quaker Road, which runs to the pond, is named for the Quakers who built a meetinghouse there. Highbank Road crosses the Bass River into Yarmouth where the banks of the river are tall. It was once known as the upper bridge, with the lower bridge in West Dennis. Near Wilbur Cove on the river is the Wilbur Preserve, named for Dr. George B. Wilbur. In the 1970s he gave the land to the Town.

Hokum Rock Road, where a drive-in movie theater once stood, is named for a cluster of stones named Hokum Rock. The name may come from the Indian word for "back bend," hoccanum, referring to the largest of the rocks which is hooked. The access road leading to the town dump, Theophilus F. Smith Road, was named for the long-time superintendent of the dump.

Flax Pond was so named because early residents would soak bundles of flax in the pond until the pulp would separate and could be used to spin linen. Just to its south at the head of the Bass River is Follins Pond, named for the 17th century settler Thomas Follins. The "funn" in Funn Pond, at the Dennis Pines golf course, is a shortened version of funnell, or a charcoal burner.

West Dennis
Part of West Dennis is known as Baker Town for the Baker family that once resided on and around Main Street in South and West Dennis. The Bakers sent 29 captains to sea, and the Ezra Baker School and the Baker Park in West Dennis are named for family members. Peter Petlz' poem describes the influence the family had in the area:

The English were prolific,

On Cape Cod's Sandy shores,
 
And if you don't believe it,
 
Look at all the Bakers.

Aunt Julia Ann Road, and the beach by the same name, is found on the Bass River, across from the Bass River Golf Club. It is named for Julia Ann Baker, the third wife and widow of Levi Baker. After he died she kept a supply store for fishermen, Levi's Chandlery. Near the beach, on Grand Cove, is Crowell Village. It was named for the Crowell or Crowe family. Henry David Thoreau passed over a toll bridge here during one of his trips to the Cape. The area was once known as Crowe Town and Crowe's Neck. Also on the neck is Horsefoot Road, and next to that is Horsefoot Cove. Horsefoot refers to a horseshoe crab.

West Dennis Beach was once known as Davis Beach, and the road that runs along the length of the beach is Davis Beach Road. Charles Henry Davis sold the beach to the Town in the early 1900s. Davis once transported and combined seven houses into a single mansion on the other side of the Bass River in South Yarmouth, giving it the name The House of Seven Chimneys. At the east end of the beach is the Lighthouse Inn on Lighthouse Road, where a lighthouse was built in 1855 and was in service until 1914.  Recently, the West Dennis Light has been restored as a private aid to navigation, and operates during the summer months.

Kelly's Pond was probably named for David and Elihu Kelly, who lived nearby in the early 1800s. The area between Kelly's Pond and the Bass River is known as Wrinkle Point. Wrinkle is another word, commonly used by locals in days gone by, for periwinkle. Uncle Barney's Road, which runs up Wrinkle Point parallel to the Bass River, was named for Barnabas Baker, who had a saltworks in the area in the 1800s.

The area between Weir Creek and Swan River was once known as Battletown, with Lower County Road being called Battletown Road. It was said by a late 1800s resident of the road, Anthony Gage, that "Men used to raise sons to send'em down her to fight."

South Village was a fishing hamlet in West Dennis during its early days that is memorialized by South Village Road, Lane, Circle, Drive, and Beach. At one end of South Village Road is Trotting Park Road, which took its name from the popular race track that was off the street in the late 1800s. At the northern end of the road is a house named Jericho. It was built by Captain Theophilus Baker in 1801, and was purchased in the 20th century by Virginia Gildersleeve and Elizabeth Reynard. They gave the house its present name because its walls were about to come "tumbling down," but they made repairs and gave the house to the town in 1962.

Climate

According to the Köppen climate classification system, Dennis, Massachusetts has a warm-summer, wet all year, humid continental climate (Dfb). Dfb climates are characterized by at least one month having an average mean temperature ≤ 32.0 °F (≤ 0.0 °C), at least four months with an average mean temperature ≥ 50.0 °F (≥ 10.0 °C), all months with an average mean temperature ≤ 71.6 °F (≤ 22.0 °C), and no significant precipitation difference between seasons. The average seasonal (Nov-Apr) snowfall total is around 30 in (76 cm). The average snowiest month is February which corresponds with the annual peak in nor'easter activity. The plant hardiness zone is 7a with an average annual extreme minimum air temperature of 2.0 °F (–16.7 °C).

Ecology

According to the A. W. Kuchler U.S. Potential natural vegetation Types, Dennis, Massachusetts would primarily contain a Northeastern Oak/Pine (110) vegetation type with a Southern Mixed Forest (26) vegetation form.

Demographics

As of the census of 2000, there were 15,973 people, 7,504 households, and 4,577 families residing in the town. The census measures the year-round population; in the summer the population is estimated to be 63,000. The racial makeup of the town was 94.99% White, 1.93% Black or African American, 0.37% Native American, 0.37% Asian, 0.88% from other races, and 1.46% from two or more races. Hispanic or Latino of any race were 1.65% of the population.

There were 7,504 households, out of which 18.8% had children under the age of 18 living with them, 49.0% were married couples living together, 9.2% had a female householder with no husband present, and 39.0% were non-families. 33.3% of all households were made up of individuals, and 17.7% had someone living alone who was 65 years of age or older. The average household size was 2.11 and the average family size was 2.65.

In the town, the population was spread out, with 16.9% under the age of 18, 4.6% from 18 to 24, 22.2% from 25 to 44, 27.8% from 45 to 64, and 28.4% who were 65 years of age or older. The median age was 49 years. For every 100 females, there were 85.6 males. For every 100 females age 18 and over, there were 82.7 males.

The median income for a household in the town was $41,598, and the median income for a family was $50,478. Males had a median income of $40,528 versus $29,153 for females. The per capita income for the town was $25,428. About 5.4% of families and 7.0% of the population were below the poverty line, including 10.4% of those under age 18 and 4.8% of those age 65 or over.

Beaches

All the public beaches in Dennis are owned by the town. The Northside beaches are located on Cape Cod Bay, while the Southside beaches are located on Nantucket Sound. Some of them have different names for different entrances. On the Northside, Corporation Beach and Howes Street Beach are on the same strip of public beach. The same goes for Mayflower Beach and Bayview* Beach, and Cold Storage* Beach and Sea Street Beach. Chapin Beach and Harborview* Beach are not paired with any other. On the Northside, the town also owns two beaches on Scargo Lake: Scargo Beach and Princess Beach.

The Southside beaches are Glendon Beach, Haigis Beach, Inman Road Beach, Raycroft Beach, Metcalfe Memorial Beach, West Dennis Beach, South Village Beach, and Sea Street Beach.

All of the public beaches in Dennis are free to walk on. However, every beach (except those with a *) charges a non-resident parking fee of $20 per day during the week, $25 per day on the weekend, or $75 per week. Residents (Dennis taxpayers) can buy beach parking stickers with proof of residency for $40 for the season. At resident-only beaches (marked with a *), non-residents may not park at all.

Mayflower Beach faces Cape Cod Bay and is named after the Pilgrims' ship, the Mayflower.

Parks and recreation

In addition to the beaches, there are several key recreation areas in the town. Johnny Kelley Recreation area in South Dennis provides a hiking/jogging trail, an exercise trail, a Braille trail, playing courts and fields, playground and picnic area. The Nobscussett Conservation Area (usually called "Indian Lands") provides easy hiking trails and views along the protected shores of Bass River, where the Nobscussetts had spent their winters. Crowe's Pasture on the north side of the town provides many acres of open land and hiking with water views. Bass River Park in West Dennis offers fine views of Bass River and the boating activity there. Popular children's playgrounds are found at the Baker School in West Dennis, at the West Dennis Community Building, and at the village green in Dennis Port.

Transportation
Dennis is crossed from east to west by Cape Cod's three main routes, U.S. Route 6, Massachusetts Route 6A and Massachusetts Route 28. Massachusetts Route 134 crosses the town south to north from Route 28 to Route 6A. (It is debatable that Route 134 is a Massachusetts state highway; it was technically the "East-West Dennis Road (Route 134)... an urban principal arterial owned by the Town" according to a Massachusetts Department of Transportation study by Howard/Stein-Hudson Associates of Boston written in July 2010. Whether it was later acquired by the state is not known. Technically, a Massachusetts state highway has to cross town lines and the East-West Dennis Road does not. In addition it is called the East West Dennis Road because it "connects" East Dennis to West Dennis, not because it runs from east to west according to the compass.) East of the Route 134 exit, Route 6 (also known as the Mid-Cape Highway) downgrades from a four-lane divided highway to a two-lane limited access highway, divided only by markers.

Prior to 2018, the Cape's Bay Colony Rail service officially ended in the town just west of Route 134. Although the right of way for this line probably existed, there has long been no railroad bridge over Bass River and therefore no trains have entered the town of Dennis for decades. In approximately 2018, this railway was removed, which allowed for the expansion of the Cape Cod Rail Trail. Construction of the extension included a pedestrian bridge over Bass River, which connected the trail to Yarmouth. The Cape Cod Rail Trail is a paved bicycle trail that runs "down" the Cape to Wellfleet along the former right-of-way of the railway. There are also several other bicycle trails in town. The nearest regional air service is at the Barnstable Municipal Airport, and the nearest national and international air service is at Logan International Airport in Boston.

Government
The town of Dennis is governed by an open town meeting form of government, and is led by a board of selectmen, which delegates day-to-day operations to a town administrator. The town has a police department, and the fire department headquartered near the intersection of Routes 28 and 134 with a branch station off of Route 6A. There are post offices in each of the five villages, as well as libraries. The central library is located in Dennis Port, and all are a part of the Cape Libraries Automated Materials Sharing library network. The town operates its own landfill, located southeast of the junction of Routes 6 and 134.

Dennis is represented in the Massachusetts House of Representatives in the First Barnstable District. The town is represented in the Massachusetts Senate as a part of the Cape and Islands District, which includes all of Cape Cod (except the towns of Bourne, Falmouth, and Sandwich), and the islands of Martha's Vineyard and Nantucket. The town is patrolled by the Second (Yarmouth) Barracks of Troop D of the Massachusetts State Police.

Dennis in the Massachusetts 9th congressional district and represented by William Keating. The state's senior (Class II) member of the United States Senate, elected in 2012, is Elizabeth Warren. The junior (Class I) senator, elected in 2013, is Ed Markey.

Education
Dennis shares its school system with Yarmouth to form the Dennis-Yarmouth Regional School District. The town itself operates the Ezra H. Baker School, which serves students from pre-kindergarten through third grade. The Nathaniel H. Wixon Middle School, which serves grades 4 and 5 from Dennis and Yarmouth and Mattacheese Middle school serves grades 6 and 7 from Dennis and Yarmouth. High school students attend Dennis-Yarmouth Regional High School in Yarmouth. Students are not officially contracted to any vocational high schools; private schools can be found in each of the neighboring towns.

Notable people

 Mary Higgins Clark, author
 Edward Gelsthorpe (1921–2009), marketing executive called "Cranapple Ed" for his best-known product launch
 Amy Jo Johnson, actress
 Gertrude Lawrence, actress
 John Sears (1744–1817), Sleepy John Sears, founder of local salt industry
 Mike Sherman, former coach of the Green Bay Packers and of the Texas A&M Aggies
 Richard Valle, founder of Valle's Steak House restaurant chain

References

External links

 Town of Dennis official website
 Dennis Chamber of Commerce
 History of Barnstable County, Massachusetts (Dennis chapter)
 Cape Cod Rail Trail
 Dennis Public Library
 Dennis Memorial Library

 
1639 establishments in Massachusetts
Populated coastal places in Massachusetts
Populated places established in 1639
Towns in Barnstable County, Massachusetts
Towns in Massachusetts